Selektsionnoye is a village in the Chüy Region of Kyrgyzstan. It is part of the Sokuluk District. Its population was 2,988 in 2021.

References

Populated places in Chüy Region